Janardan Shankar Mahashabde was an Indian ophthalmologist. He was the founder of Mahashabde Netralaya and the Indore Eye Hospital. He was one of the early members of the Indore Divisional Ophthalmologist Society (IDOS). The Government of India awarded him the fourth highest civilian honour of the Padma Shri in 1992. The All India Ophthalmological Society has instituted an award, Mahashabde Award, in memory of the ophthalmologist.

References 

Recipients of the Padma Shri in medicine
Scientists from Indore
Indian ophthalmologists
20th-century Indian medical doctors
Medical doctors from Madhya Pradesh
20th-century surgeons